USCGC Bitt (WYTL-65613) was a cutter in the U.S. Coast Guard. Constructed by Western Boat Building Corp and commissioned in 1966, the vessel served as part of the USCG for sixteen years before being decommissioned in 1982 and transferred to the National Science Foundation (NSF). During her Coast Guard service Bitt was based in Washington and Alaska where she was utilized mainly in a law enforcement and search and rescue (SAR) role. She has since been purchased by a civilian couple who are living and raising their first child aboard the vessel.

Construction and design 

Crewed by five personnel, Bitt was a small vessel displacing 74 tons. She carried no armament, but was fitted with a SPN-11 detection radar. Upon completion she cost a total of $US 158,366 to construct.

History 

Bitt was one of fifteen steel-hulled icebreaking small harbor tugs that were put into service in the 1960s to replace  wooden-hulled harbor tugs that the Coast Guard had used since the 1940s. She was initially homeported at Bellingham, Washington where her duties included law enforcement and SAR as well as ice operations. On 5 January 1969 she assisted in the evacuation of a stranded person near the Nooksack River when a dike broke. On 29 July 1969 she towed the disabled fishing vessel Jet Stream to safety from Admiralty Inlet. On 20 October 1975 she rescued two persons from a capsized sailboat. She transferred to Valdez, Alaska in 1978. She was decommissioned in October 1982 and transferred to the National Science Foundation for use as the Research Vessel Clifford A. Barnes. After serving through an agreement with the University of Washington School of Oceanography research facilities at Seattle, Washington, the vessel was decommissioned by the University of Washington at the end of 2018. She was purchased at auction by a civilian couple in 2019 who renamed her back to Bitt. The couple currently live aboard her with their child in Northern California.

Notes 

Citations

References
 
 
 
 National Science Foundation News article on R/V Clifford A. Barnes

1966 ships
Ships of the United States Coast Guard
USCG 65' small harbor tugs
Ships built by the Western Boat Building Company